Arthur Marcus Cecil Sandys, 3rd Baron Sandys (28 January 1798 – 10 April 1863), known as Lord Marcus Hill until 1860, was a British Whig politician. Lea & Perrins has claimed that Sandys encountered a precursor to Worcestershire sauce while in India with the East India Company in the 1830s, and commissioned the local apothecaries to recreate it, eventually leading to its popularity in England.

Background
Born Lord Marcus Hill, Sandys was a younger son of Arthur Hill, 2nd Marquess of Downshire, and Mary, 1st Baroness Sandys, daughter of Colonel the Hon. Martin Sandys. Arthur Hill, 3rd Marquess of Downshire, was his elder brother.

Political career

Sandys was Member of Parliament for Newry from 1832 to 1835 and for Evesham from 1838 to 1852. He served as Comptroller of the Household under Lord Melbourne in 1841 and under Lord John Russell between 1846 and 1847 and as Treasurer of the Household under Russell between 1847 and 1852. In 1860 he succeeded his elder brother as third Baron Sandys. The following year he assumed by royal licence the surname of Sandys in lieu of Hill.

Family

Lord Sandys married Louisa, daughter of Joseph Blake, in 1837. He died in April 1863, aged 65, and was succeeded by his eldest son, Augustus. Lady Sandys died in April 1886.

He was a godfather to Arthur Cheek, "the young martyr of Allahabad", who was given the forenames Arthur Marcus Hill in his honour.

Arms

References

External links 

1798 births
1863 deaths
Hill, Lord Marcus
Treasurers of the Household
Hill, Lord Marcus
Hill, Lord Marcus
Hill, Lord Marcus
Hill, Lord Marcus
UK MPs who inherited peerages
Hill, Lord Marcus
Hill, Lord Marcus
Younger sons of marquesses
Younger sons of barons
Marcus
Members of the Privy Council of the United Kingdom
Marcus